Brian Francis Connolly (5 October 1945 – 9 February 1997) was a Scottish singer-songwriter, musician and actor, best known as the lead singer of glam rock band The Sweet between 1968 and 1979 and renowned for his charismatic stage presence and distinctive voice.

Early life
Connolly was born in 1945 in Hamilton, South Lanarkshire. His mother was a teenage waitress, Frances Connolly, who left him in a Glasgow hospital as an infant whilst he was possibly suffering from meningitis. The identity of his biological father was never made public. Connolly was fostered at the age of two by Jim and Helen McManus of Blantyre, South Lanarkshire and took their family name. After inadvertently discovering his lineage, he eventually reverted to the name Connolly. The McManuses were the family of Mark McManus, of Taggart fame. Both men perceived a resemblance between them, and supposed McManus's father to have also been Connolly's.

In a radio interview, Connolly reported that singing was a large part of growing up since there was no television, and that he was regularly called upon to sing for family and friends. Connolly has credited the Everly Brothers as being his earliest musical influence.

Career

Early career
At the age of 12, Connolly moved to Harefield, Greater London, where he attended the local secondary modern school. In his mid-teens he joined the Merchant Navy, and got a tiger's head tattooed on his right arm during his Navy service. On his discharge from the Merchant Navy in 1963 he returned to Harefield and played in a number of local bands, including Generation X (not to be confused with the punk rock band from the late 70s, fronted by Billy Idol) from mid-1965 until about October 1966. The group recorded four tracks but these were not commercially released. The lineup featured Connolly on vocals, Chris Eldridge and Lee Mordecai on guitars, Mark Conway (bass) and drummer Martin Lass. Connolly eventually replaced singer Ian Gillan (later of Deep Purple fame) in a band called Wainwright's Gentlemen, which included drummer Mick Tucker.

Sweet (1968–1979)

Tucker and Connolly left Wainwright's Gentlemen in late 1967 and recruited guitarist Frank Torpey, and bassist Steve Priest, naming their new band The Sweetshop. On the eve of releasing their debut single, Slow Motion, in July 1968, the band shortened their name to The Sweet. They recorded a further three unsuccessful singles; Andy Scott joined the line-up in late 1970, just before the release of their first hit single "Funny, Funny." After this, Connolly was propelled into the limelight, with many appearances on Top of the Pops, with the other members of the Sweet.

In 1974, Connolly was badly beaten after leaving a nightclub in Staines where he received several kicks to his throat resulting in his being unable to sing for some time and permanently losing some of his previously wide vocal range. This incident also meant the band missed out on supporting The Who at Charlton Athletic Football Ground. Several songs on the Sweet Fanny Adams album had to be sung by other members of the band.

As time progressed issues between Connolly and other members of Sweet developed and he would find the band excluding him from decisions. Connolly developed a significant problem with alcoholism in the mid-1970s. During 1977, when no tours were undertaken and two of Sweet's most successful albums were recorded, the power struggle within the band became even more apparent. Connolly's chronic alcohol abuse further compromised his role with the band as his voice began showing the impact in recordings and on stage during Sweet's 1978 US tour. He played his last British show with the classic Sweet line-up at Hammersmith Odeon, London on 24 February 1978. His final live performance with the band was in July 1978 in Florida, US, when they supported Alice Cooper. His departure was not made public until March 1979.

After Sweet (1979–1983)
After news of his leaving Sweet broke, Connolly was interviewed by the German music magazine Bravo, in which he said he was taking time off to be with his family, and considering a new musical direction (countrified rock). By mid- to late 1979 he had recorded several new tracks at Chipping Norton Recording Studios, in Oxfordshire, with the assistance of friend and producer Mick Angus. The following year one of the tracks, "Take Away The Music", was re-recorded at the Marquee Studios, London with then Polydor producer Pip Williams.

On 22 June 1979, Connolly made his first major appearance since leaving the Sweet, at the Bravo Super Disco '79 at the Olympiahalle, Munich. Ten thousand people heard Connolly perform a preview of first solo Polydor single: "Take Away The Music". The single was issued in 1980 by Polydor, and was included on the 1980 Polydor Germany High Life compilation album.

In 1981, Connolly was admitted to hospital with bloating, and he sustained multiple heart attacks. His health was permanently affected with some paralysis on his left side which would later develop into a nervous system condition. These problems were most likely related to Connolly's excessive alcohol consumption and heavy smoking, coupled with the use of prescription diuretic medicine.

Connolly's next release was "Don't You Know a Lady", composed by Roger Greenaway. The song was recorded by British four-piece band Brooks shortly after Connolly's release. The track failed to make an impact. In 1982 with his Polydor contract expired, Connolly signed with French independent label, Carrere Records. Carrere then released the hard-rock single "Hypnotized", written by Joe Lynn Turner. A Fandango cover, the track was released in Europe with wide distribution by RCA but failed to chart. During this time Connolly recorded several new tracks for an album schedued for release in August 1983, however the album was not released.

In January 1983, Connolly supported Pat Benatar for three shows in Birmingham, Newcastle and the Hammersmith Odeon, London. Connolly's band Encore, included most of the members of Verity, fronted by ex-Argent guitarist John Verity, and Terry Uttley, the bass player from Smokie. Songs played included "Windy City", "Fox on the Run", "Hypnotized" and new numbers, "Sick and Tired", "Red Hair Rage" and "Burning The Candle". The new tracks were made available on a bootleg 7" single and CD. 

The Inland Revenue served Connolly and the other members of the Sweet with a multimillion-pound tax assessment for the income earned from their hit records. Connolly sold his house to pay his share of the tax bill.

New Sweet and reunions

From early 1984 onward, despite recurrent ill health, Connolly toured the UK and Europe with his band The New Sweet. His most successful concerts were annual appearances in West Germany, before and after Germany's reunification. He visited other countries including Denmark, and continued to perform sporadically in the UK. In 1985, Connolly had reportedly stopped. The same year he separated from his wife Marilyn, with the divorce finalised in 1986.

During 1987, Connolly again encountered Frank Torpey, the original Sweet lead guitarist from 1968 to 1969. According to Torpey, Connolly was seeking a German recording deal. Torpey subsequently invited Connolly to record with him, as an informal project. Running late, Connolly turned up and the track "Sharontina" was recorded, but would not be released until Torpey's 1998 album, Sweeter.

In 1988, the producer Mike Chapman arranged for Connolly and former band members Mick Tucker, Steve Priest and Andy Scott to reunite in Los Angeles, California, and rework studio versions of "Action" and "The Ballroom Blitz". The reunion was with a view to producing a new album for MCA Records, however due to problems with Connolly's voice, the project failed and Connolly returned to The New Sweet. 

In 1990, he reunited with the original Sweet line-up for the promotion of a music video documentary at Tower Records, London.

By July 1990, plans were made for Connolly and The New Sweet  to tour Australia. A number of dates were planned, with the tour starting in Adelaide, and proceeded during November. However, during the long flight to Australia, Connolly's suffered health issues and he was hospitalised in Adelaide Hospital for dehydration and related problems. The band played a show in Adelaide without Connolly. Other shows included one at the Dingley Powerhouse, with the final Australian show at Melbourne's Old Greek Theatre. It was felt at the time that Connolly's health was sufficient reason for the tour not to be extended, and some of the later planned dates were abandoned. Connolly returned to England and his band appeared on The Bob Downe Christmas Show, on 18 December 1990.

During the early 1990s, Connolly played the European "oldies" circuit and occasional outdoor festivals in Europe with the band. 

On 22 March 1992, a heavy-duty tape recorder was stolen from the band's van while they were performing the Bristol Hippodrome with Mud. The tape recorder contained demos of four new songs and approximately 20 mixes. 

Legal problems continued over use of the Sweet name between Connolly and Andy Scott. In something of a truce, both parties agreed to distinguish their group's name to help promoters and fans. The New Sweet became Brian Connolly's Sweet and Andy Scott's band became Andy Scott's Sweet. Connolly and The New Sweet continued to tour UK and Europe. 

In 1994, The New Sweet played in Dubai, and appeared at the Galleria Theatre, Hyatt Regency and Bahrain. By this time, Connolly had healed the differences with Steve Priest and Mick Tucker, and was invited to the wedding of Priest's eldest daughter, Lisa. At the private function, for which Priest specially flew back to England, Priest and Connolly performed together.

Let's Go and solo work (1995–1996)

In 1995, Connolly released a new album, Let's Go, backed up with merchandising. His partner Jean, whom he had met a few years earlier, gave birth to a son that year. In 1995, Jean succeeded in locating Connolly's biological family. An aunt in Ontario, Canada, revealed that Connolly's true birth mother had died in 1989. She also informed him that he had a living brother and sister, whom he met up with in England.

On 2 November 1996, British TV network Channel 4 aired a programme Don't Leave Me This Way, which examined Connolly's time as a pop star with The Sweet, the subsequent decline in the band's popularity, and the impact on the band members. The show revealed Connolly's ill health, but also that he was continuing with his concert dates at Butlins, where Connolly and his band had appeared a number of times on tour during the early 1990s. 

Connolly's final concert was at the Bristol Hippodrome on 5 December 1996, with Slade II and John Rossall's Glitter Band Experience.

Death

In January 1997, Connolly had a heart attack and was hospitalised in Slough. After a week in hospital he discharged himself, but was readmitted the following week. Connolly died around midnight of 9–10 February 1997, as a result of kidney and liver failure and repeated heart attacks. He was 51 years old.

On 17 February 1997, Connolly was cremated after a ceremony at Most Holy Name Roman Catholic Church at Old Mill Road, Denham, Buckinghamshire. His ashes were scattered over the water by his daughters Nicola and Michelle. He was also survived by his ex-wife, Marilyn, his girlfriend Jean and their one-year-old son Brian, born 26 May 1995. On 11 October 1998, fans organised a memorial concert for Connolly at the Camden Palace in London. 

Money was raised for a plaque dedicated to Connolly at Breakspear Crematorium, Breakspear Road, Ruislip, Middlesex. It was unveiled on 9 February 2000. 

In 2013, Connolly's son, Brian Jr., competed in the television talent show The X Factor.  Brian Jr.'s mother, Jean, married and now lives with a former band member, Glenn Williams, in Spain.

Band members

Personnel

Brian Connolly Band
 Brian Connolly – lead vocals (1979–1984)
 John Verity – guitar (1979–1984)
 Chas Cronk – bass (1979–1982)
 Tony Fernandez – drums, percussion (1979–1982)
 Dave Lambert – guitar (1979–1982)
 Brian Willoughby – guitar (1979–1982)
 Clive Barrett – guitar (1982–1984)
 Steve Rodford – drums, percussion (1982–1984)
 Terry Uttley – bass (1982–1984)

The New Sweet / Brian Connolly's Sweet

 Brian Connolly – lead vocals (1984–1997)
 Phil Ridden – drums, percussion (1984–1986, 1993)
 Brian Rawson – guitar (1984)
 Geoff Roots – bass (1984)
 Gary Farmer – bass (1984–1990, 1990–1993)
 Steve Turner – guitar (1984–1990, 1990–1993)
 Michael Williams – guitar (1984–1990, 1990–1992)
 Steve Berry – bass (1990)
 Neale Haywood – guitar (1990)
 Martin Saunders – drums (1990)

 Dave Farmer – drums, percussion (1990–1993, 1994–1996)
 Steve Mulvey – keyboards (1993–1997)
 Bjorn Hurrel – bass (1993–1994)
 Mel Johnson – guitar (1993–1994)
 Glenn Williams – guitar (1994–1997)
 Martin Cook – bass (1994–1995)
 Drew Murphy – drums, percussion (1994–1995)
 Dave Glover – bass (1995–1997)
 Russ Mahoney – drums, percussion (1995–1996)
 Jeff King – drums, percussion (1996–1997)

Lineups

Discography

With Sweet

As Brian Connolly

Singles
"Take Away the Music" b/w "Alabama Man" (1980) – Polydor Records
"Don't You Know a Lady" b/w "Phone You"(1980) – Polydor Records
"Hypnotized" b/w "Fade Away" (1982) – Carrere Records, RCA Records

Albums
Brian Connolly and The Sweet – Greatest Hits (1986) – new recordings of Sweet singles – Success Records
Let's Go (1995) – Sweet re-recordings and three new post-Sweet tracks – Bam Records
Take Away the Music (2004) – compilation of solo singles and demos – Malibu Records

Appears on
 Closed (Belgian psychedelic band) – guide vocals on "My Little Girl From Kentucky" and "Spider"
 "Remember December" by Paper Dolls – backing vocals (1970)
  High Life 20 Original Top Hits (1980) Polydor Germany – Features "Take Away the Music"
 Sweeter (1998) by Frank Torpey, CD Album – Notable for Brian Connolly's 1997 lead vocal track, "Sharontina" – Frankie Dean Records

List of songs

"Generation X" (aka The Troop)

"Wainwright's Gentlemen"

As Brian Connolly 
The column Song list the song title; bold means released as a single.
The column Writer(s) lists who wrote the song.
The column Time shows its length.
The column Album lists the album the song is featured on.
The column Producer lists the producer of the song.
The column Year lists the year in which the song was released.

As Brian Connolly's Sweet 

The "Old Sweet" material are new recordings.

References

Further reading

External links
Biography at Hot Shot Digital
Brian Connolly in themusicsover.com
Brian Connolly in last.fm. 
Brian Connolly in thedeadrockstarsclub.com

1945 births
1997 deaths
20th-century Scottish male singers
Scottish rock singers
Scottish singer-songwriters
Scottish people of Irish descent
Scottish Roman Catholics
Musicians from London
Musicians from Glasgow
People from Hamilton, South Lanarkshire
People from Harefield
Alcohol-related deaths in England
Deaths from kidney failure
Deaths from liver failure
The Sweet members
Polydor Records artists
RCA Records artists
Glam rock musicians
Scottish tenors